Miss Venezuela 1957 was the fifth edition of Miss Venezuela pageant held at Tamanaco Intercontinental Hotel in Caracas, Venezuela, on June 28, 1957. The winner of the pageant was Consuelo Nouel, Miss Distrito Federal.

The famous presenter Renny Ottolina hosted the event.

Results
Miss Venezuela 1957 - Consuelo Nouel (Miss Distrito Federal)
1st runner-up - Bertha Dávila (Miss Lara)
2nd runner-up - Elsa Torrens (Miss Carabobo)
3rd runner-up - Luisa Vásquez (Miss Sucre)
4th runner-up - Olga Lavieri (Miss Aragua)

Delegates

 Miss Amazonas - Marbelia Mejías
 Miss Anzoátegui - Yolanda Montenegro
 Miss Apure - Carmen Alicia Moreno
 Miss Aragua - Olga Lavieri Varganciano
 Miss Barinas - Thais Margarita Ferrer
 Miss Bolívar - Anita Benedetti
 Miss Carabobo - Elsa Torrens
 Miss Caracas - Sonia Dugarte Bravo
 Miss Cojedes - Aida Fernández Trujillo
 Miss Delta Amacuro - Lilia Hernández
 Miss Distrito Federal - Consuelo Nouel Gómez
  Miss Falcón - Graciela Domínguez Egea
 Miss Lara - Bertha Gisela Dávila
 Miss Maracay - Elvira Ríos
 Miss Mérida - Elsa Maria Avendaño
 Miss Miranda - Dilia Pacheco
 Miss Nueva Esparta - Brenda Kohn Coronado
 Miss Portuguesa - María de los Angeles Ramírez Dovale (Maruja)
 Miss Sucre - Luisa Vásquez Torres
 Miss Yaracuy - Mary Quiroz Delgado
 Miss Zulia - Emma Luisa Quintana

External links
Miss Venezuela official website

1957 beauty pageants
1957 in Venezuela